Letheobia uluguruensis, also known as the Uluguru gracile blind snake or Uluguri worm snake, is a species of snake in the Typhlopidae family. This species is endemic to the Uluguru Mountains of eastern Tanzania.

References

uluguruensis
Reptiles of Tanzania
Endemic fauna of Tanzania
Reptiles described in 1928
Taxa named by Thomas Barbour
Taxa named by Arthur Loveridge